Baphia pubescens is a medium size tree common in Guineo-Congolian forest.

It is a pioneer species associated with acidic soils in Ghana. It thrives in the forest understory.

There are medicinal uses for the bark, bark oil, and sap of the tree, as they are said to be antirheumatic and a diuretic. The wood is used to produce dye and for carpentry.

References 

pubescens